Erinaceusyllis hartmannschroederae is a species belonging to the phylum Annelida, a group known as the segmented worms. This species was previously described in Australia as Sphaerosyllis erinaceus and S. erinaceus erinaceus, a species distributed throughout the globe. These species appear to be a species complex. Previous descriptions stated that the two aforementioned species possess compound chaetae blades which are long and slender. Several subspecies of S. erinaceus were described on the basis of differences in shapes and sizes of their compound chaetae; such differences are enough to consider them as distinct species. The species is named in honour of Gesa Hartmann-Schröder, an expert on syllid species.

Description
It possesses short papillae on its dorsum, parapodia and cirri. Its prostomium is ovate, showing 4 eyes in a trapezoidal arrangement, as well as 2 anterior eyespots. Its antennae have bulbous bases and short tips, its median antenna shorter than the combined length of its prostomium and palps. The palps are shorter than its prostomium, fused along their length. Its peristomium forms a trilobed hood, covering the prostomium.

It carries two densely ciliated nuchal organs. Its tentacular cirri and antennae are alike, but smaller, the dorsal cirri being longer than the tentacular cirri, being absent on chaetiger 2. Its parapodia are rectangular, with two small papillae.

It shows heteromorphic compound chaetae, with smooth shafts, provided with fine spines. The blades are short and unidentate, all similar in length, approximately ranging from 10 to 13µm. Its anterior parapodia count with about 6-7 compound chaetae. The number of posterior compound chaetae declines to a number of 5 on each posterior parapodium. Erinaceusyllis hartmannschroederae shows dorsal simple chaetae on anterior parapodia from chaetiger 1, provided sometimes with marginal spines. The ventral simple chaetae are slender and unidentate. Its acicula is solitary and acuminate.

The pharynx spans approximately 4 segments. Its pharyngeal tooth is placed near the opening. Its proventricle is long and wide, barrel-shaped, spanning 3 to 4 segments, with 18-20 muscle cell rows. Its pygidium is semicircular, with 2 anal cirri, similar to its dorsal cirri but rather longer and with papillae.

Distribution

References

Further reading
Aguado, M. Teresa, and Christoph Bleidorn. "Conflicting signal within a single gene confounds syllid phylogeny (Syllidae, Annelida)." Molecular Phylogenetics and Evolution 55.3 (2010): 1128-1138.
Aguado, M. Teresa, Guillermo San Martín, and Mark E. Siddall. "Systematics and evolution of syllids (Annelida, Syllidae)." Cladistics 28.3 (2012): 234-250.
Glasby, Christopher J., Paul C. Schroeder, and Maria Teresa Aguado. "Branching out: a remarkable new branching syllid (Annelida) living in a Petrosia sponge (Porifera: Demospongiae)." Zoological Journal of the Linnean Society 164.3 (2012): 481-497.
Aguado, M. Teresa, Arne Nygren, and Mark E. Siddall. "Phylogeny of Syllidae (Polychaeta) based on combined molecular analysis of nuclear and mitochondrial genes." Cladistics 23.6 (2007): 552-564.

External links

WORMS entry

Syllidae